Bandit is a Welsh language music television show on S4C, produced by Boomerang Plus. It included live performances, videos and interviews and was presented by Huw Stephens, Elis James, Sarra Elgan, Rhydian Bowen Phillips and Huw Evans. The programme aimed to raise the profile of Welsh-language popular music but also included music from Wales with lyrics in other languages (usually English). The last episode of Bandit was broadcast on 28 December 2011, after a decade of being on the air. The special show was presented by Stephens and Evans.

The Bandit team also used to organise several gigs each year and the show was considered to be S4C's flagship music programme. Their multiple nominations for BAFTA Cymru awards each year demonstrated the programme's appeal. One of their BAFTAs was won for "Best Title Sequence/Best Motion Graphics".

References

External links

S4C original programming
2001 British television series debuts
2011 British television series endings
2000s Welsh television series
2010s Welsh television series
2000s British music television series
2010s British music television series